A principal dancer (often shortened to principal) is a dancer at the highest rank within a professional dance company, particularly a ballet company.

A principal may be male or female. The position is similar to that of soloist; however, principals regularly perform not only solos, but also pas de deux. Principal dancers can be hired into a dance company or can also be a company dancer that is a corps de ballet dancer that gets promoted from within the company. That process can take multiple performance seasons or even years to achieve based on skill level and company interest.  It is a coveted position in the company and the most prominent position a dancer can receive. The term is used mostly in ballet but can be used in other forms as well, such as modern dance. They are usually the star of the ballet. The term senior principal dancer is sometimes used as well.

Synonyms and origin 
The Italian derived term prima ballerina (female dancers) (primo ballerino for male dancers) or the French derived term premier danseur (male dancers) have been used to denote similar levels of prominence in non Anglo-Saxon companies. In the Paris Opera Ballet, principal dancers receive the title of Danseur Étoile.

Current principal dancers

Royal Ballet 

Matthew Ball, Federico Bonelli, Alexander Campbell, Cesar Corrales, Lauren Cuthbertson, Francesca Hayward, Ryoichi Hirano, Fumi Kaneko, Sarah Lamb, Mayara Magri, Steven McRae, Laura Morera, Vadim Muntagirov, Yasmine Naghdi, Marianela Nuñez, Natalia Osipova, Anna Rose O’Sullivan, Marcelino Sambé, Akane Takada

Current principal dancers

American Ballet Theatre 

 Catherine Hurlin
 Isabella Boylston
 Misty Copeland
 Gillian Murphy
 Hee Seo
 Devon Teuscher
 Christine Shevchenko
 Skylar Brandt

 Herman Cornejo
 David Hallberg
 Daniil Simkin
 Cory Stearns
 James B. Whiteside
 Aran Bell

Martha Graham Modern Dance Company 

 PeiJu Chien-Pott
 Xin Ying

 Lloyd Knight
 Ben Schultz

Miami City Ballet 

 Alexander Peters
 Ashley Knox
 Jennifer Lauren
 Katia Carranza
 Nathalia Arja
 Renan Cerdeiro
 Stanislav Olshanskyi
 Steven Loch
 Yuliia Moskalenko
 Tricia Albertson
 Chase Swatosh
 Dawn Atkins
 Hannah Fischer
 Samantha Hope Galler
 Shimon Ito

New York City Ballet 

 Jared Angle 
 Tyler Angle 
 Harrison Ball 
 Ashley Bouder 
 Chun Wai Chan 
 Adrian Danchig-Waring 
 Megan Fairchild 
 Jovani Furlan 
 Joseph Gordon 
 Anthony Huxley 
 Russell Janzen 
 Sara Mearns 
 Tiler Peck 
 Unity Phelan 
 Taylor Stanley 
 Daniel Ulbricht 
 Andrew Veyette 
 Peter Walker 
 Indiana Woodward

Bolshoi Ballet Company 

 Alyona Kovalyova
 Ekaterina Krysanova
 Anna Nikulina
 Evgenia Obraztsova
 Eleonora Sevenard
 Anastasia Stashkevich
 Yulia Stepanova
 Svetlana Zakharova
 Artemy Belyakov
 Vladislav Lantratov
 Artem Ovcharenko
 Igor Tsvirko
 Semyon Chudin
 Mikhail Lobukhin
 Denis Rodkin
 Egor Gerashchenko
 Vyacheslav Lopatin
 Denis Savin

References 

Ballet occupations